The men's canoe sprint C-1 1000 metres at the 2016 Olympic Games in Rio de Janeiro took place between 15 and 16 August at Lagoa Stadium. The medals were presented by Tony Estanguet, IOC member, France and István Vaskuti, First Vice President of the ICF.

Competition format

The competition comprised heats, semifinals, and a final round.  The top boats from each heat advances to the "A" final, and the remaining boats advance to the semifinals.  The top two boats in each semifinal and the next overall best boat advanced to the "A" final, and competed for medals.  A placing "B" final was held for the other semifinalists.

Schedule

All times are Brasilia Time (UTC-03:00)

Results

Heats
First boat progresses to A final and the remaining boats are qualified for the semifinals.

Heat 1

Heat 2

Heat 3

Semifinals
The fastest two canoeists in each semifinal, and the overall next best time qualify for the 'A' final. The next four canoeists in each semifinal qualify for the 'B' final.

Semifinal 1

Semifinal 2

Finals

Final B

Final A

 Serghei Tarnovschi finished third, but was suspended and stripped of his bronze medal due to a failed doping test.

References

Canoeing at the 2016 Summer Olympics
Men's events at the 2016 Summer Olympics